Strabena cachani is a butterfly in the family Nymphalidae. It is found on Madagascar. The habitat consists of forests.

References

Strabena
Butterflies described in 1950
Endemic fauna of Madagascar
Butterflies of Africa